The 2000 Asian Weightlifting Championships were held in Osaka, Japan between May 3 and May 6, 2000. It was the 32nd men's and 13th women's championship. The event was organised by the Asian Weightlifting Federation.

Medal summary

Men

Women

Medal table 

Ranking by Big (Total result) medals 

Ranking by all medals: Big (Total result) and Small (Snatch and Clean & Jerk)

Participating nations 
135 athletes from 17 nations competed.

 (15)
 (15)
 (13)
 (14)
 (15)
 (3)
 (5)
 (1)
 (3)
 (3)
 (2)
 (6)
 (14)
 (10)
 (5)
 (8)
 (3)

References
Men's Results
Women's Results

Asian Weightlifting Championships
Asian Weightlifting Championships
Weightlifting Championships
Asian Weightlifting Championships
International weightlifting competitions hosted by Japan